Hosewells Branch is a stream in Talbot County, Maryland, running for about  near the town of Easton at an average elevation of . It flows into King's Creek, and thence into the Choptank River and Chesapeake Bay.

References

Rivers of Maryland
Tributaries of the Chesapeake Bay